Labdoor is a privately held medical company registered in San Francisco, California, founded in May 2012 by Neil Thanedar. It provides information on dietary supplements, which do not require testing by the FDA in the United States.

History 
Born and raised in St. Louis, Missouri, the son of Shri Thanedar, Neil Thanedar graduated from the University of Michigan in Ann Arbor, Michigan, with degrees in Cellular & Molecular Biology and Business Administration.

Neil Thanedar co-founded Avomeen Analytical Services with his father in 2010. He founded Labdoor (originally "Labrdr Inc") in May 2012 with co-founders Rafael Ferreira, Helton Souza, and Tercio Junker.  Labdoor pursued venture investors in 2012, 2015, and 2016, ultimately securing approximately $11 Million from groups including Y Combinator, Floodgate Fund, and Rock Health. A controlling share of Avomeen Analytical Services was sold to an investment group in 2016.

Products and services 
Since November 2013, Labdoor's primary income is affiliate marketing for retailers, such as Amazon, of products they have tested and certified. Labdoor also offers testing services to supplement manufacturers, assessing "accuracy", "purity", and "sport". If a product passes testing, Labdoor will also "drive sales" through its certification program and retailer referrals.

As of September 2021, Labdoor's new product selection procedure uses market research and an internal "tally of votes" system to choose which new product category will be selected to test next.

In June 2018, Labdoor launched the crypto-currency TEST. It seeks to create a incentive system for individuals or organizations to anonymously create or raise a bounty on a product for independent laboratories to test. TEST will be in initial coin offering (ICO) stage through December 2018.

Labdoor buys dietary supplements directly from retailers, sends the products to an FDA-registered laboratory for analysis, and publishes the findings. Its mission is to share information to help consumers make the right decisions for themselves about dietary supplements. Labdoor's rankings have sometimes been published by the press and online media.

Government and legal interactions 
Their findings resulted in the FDA taking a closer look at the safety of energy drinks. Labdoor evaluated Alex Jones's supplements, stating "the science behind many of their claimed ingredients are questionable." Some 2015 tests of supplement products conducted by a third-party laboratory, which was organized by Labdoor and the Canadian Broadcasting Corporation (CBC), were first published and later retracted upon repeat testing. The supplements were correctly labeled and there was no contamination nor deficiency in the products.

As of August 2016, Labdoor allows manufacturers to challenge a report of a product by re-testing the product, or opt-out of having any reports of the manufacturer's products published on Labdoor's website.

See also
Dietary supplement
Examine.com
Natural Standard
ConsumerLab.com

References

Privately held companies based in California
Consumer guides
Consumer organizations in the United States
Product-testing organizations